Kosta Barka is an Albanian politician of the Greek minority.

From 2005 to 2008 he served as Minister of social affairs and equal opportunities in Sali Berisha's government, representing the Union for Human Rights (UHRP), an ethnic Greek minority party.
He was replaced in October 2008 by another member of the same party, after an internal party dispute.

In May 2009 Barka was put under investigation for abuse of power, accused of mishandling funds and donations aimed for an NGO that ran a school for children of families caught in blood feuds, in the town of Poliçan, near Berat.

From 2011 onwards, he served as member of the Assembly of the Republic of Albania for the Democratic Party of Albania. 

He has a son, Mario.

Footnotes

Living people
Democratic Party of Albania politicians
Members of the Parliament of Albania
21st-century Albanian politicians
Year of birth missing (living people)